Moogara is a rural locality in the local government area (LGA) of Derwent Valley in the South-east LGA region of Tasmania. The 2016 census has a population of 49 for the state suburb of Moogara.

Geography
While Moogara's population is not as high as it once was, it is still home to several families some of which are direct descendants of those who originally settled in the area. The Plenty River forms much of the eastern boundary.

History 
Moogara is a confirmed locality.

It was named by Barney McGuire. He named it Moogara as it is Aboriginal for "Journey of one day" as it took him this long to walk from Plenty to select his property.

Moogara's hub was the post office, which began business on 11 November 1911 under Mrs H. Simco. On 1 September 1924 it was taken over by Amos McGuire; it was run by the McGuire family until it closed on 31 January 1970. Emma Townsend (née McGuire) was the last postmistress; Emma and husband Norman lived where the old post office was located until 1999.

Road infrastructure
Route C610 (Moogara Road) passes through from north-east to north-west.

Climate

References

Towns in Tasmania
Localities of Derwent Valley Council